Batlukov is a rural locality (a khutor) in Alexeyevsky District, Belgorod Oblast, Russia. The population was 19 as of 2010. There is 1 street.

Geography 
Batlukov is located 14 km southeast of Alexeyevka (the district's administrative centre) by road. Matryono-Gezovo is the nearest rural locality.

References 

Rural localities in Alexeyevsky District, Belgorod Oblast
Biryuchensky Uyezd